The Edifice is a 1997 work of interactive fiction by Lucian P. Smith about the evolution of an early anthropoid in stone-age times. It is distributed in z-code format as freeware. The game won the 1997 Interactive Fiction Competition, and went on to also win that year's XYZZY Award for Best Puzzles and XYZZY Award for Best Individual Puzzle. It gained plaudits for its famous "language puzzle".

References
Game entry at Baf's Guide

External links
The Edifice at IFDB, the Interactive Fiction Database

1997 video games
1990s interactive fiction
Video games developed in the United States